Chaoborus punctipennis is a species of phantom midges (flies in the family Chaoboridae).

References

External links

 

Chaoboridae
Diptera of North America
Insects described in 1823
Taxa named by Thomas Say
Articles created by Qbugbot